An Internet forum, or message board, is an online discussion site where people can hold conversations in the form of posted messages.

Forums act as centralized locations for topical discussion. The Forum format is derived from BBS and Usenet. The most notable and significant Internet forums communities have converged around topics ranging from medicine to technology, and vocations and hobbies.

Forums are an element of  social media technologies which take on many different forms including blogs, business networks, enterprise social networks, forums, microblogs, photo sharing, products/services review, social bookmarking, social gaming, social networks, video sharing and virtual worlds.

0–9

A

B

C

D

E

F

G

H

I

J

K

L

M

N

O

P

Q

R

S

T

U

V

W

X

Y

Z

See also 
 Comparison of civic technology platforms
 Comparison of Internet forum software
 Comparison of Q&A sites
 Lists of websites
 Forum spam

References

Further reading 
 

 
Entertainment lists
Lists of websites